Radio Noordzee may refer to:
 a radio station broadcasting from the REM Island in 1964 (alongside TV Noordzee)
 Radio Noordzee Internationaal, broadcasting from the vessel Mebo II from 1970 - 1974
 Dutch commercial radio station Radio Noordzee (free radio), broadcasting from 1988 - 1999 on FM in the Netherlands